José "Pito" Torres Ramírez is a Puerto Rican politician affiliated with the Popular Democratic Party (PPD). He has been a member of the Puerto Rico House of Representatives since 2009 representing District 27.

Early years and studies

José Torres Ramírez was born in Coamo, Puerto Rico on July 27, 1962. He studied at the Colegio Nuestra Señora de Valvanera, and then at the island's public school system.

Torres Ramírez graduated from the school of Mortuary Sciences of Mayagüez, and is a member of the College of Health Professionals. He also studied at the Pontifical Catholic University of Puerto Rico and is certified in handling fraud.

Professional career

Torres Ramírez worked as a retailer. He was president of the Retailers Association of Coamo and president of the Employers Board of the South, and president of the Board of Directors of the San Blas Savings and Credit Cooperative. He also served as Vicepresident of the Board of the Puerto Rico Multiple Insurances Cooperative.

Political career

Torres Ramírez was first elected to the House of Representatives of Puerto Rico at the 2008 general election, to represent District 27. During his first term, he was a member of the Commission of Treasury, Internal Affairs, Housing, Consumer Affairs, Education, and others.

He was reelected for a second term in 2012.

References

External links
José Torres Ramírez Official biography

Living people
1972 births
People from Coamo, Puerto Rico
Pontifical Catholic University of Puerto Rico alumni
Popular Democratic Party members of the House of Representatives of Puerto Rico